"The Flood" is a song performed by the Georgian-born, British singer Katie Melua and the lead single from her 4th studio album The House. It was released on 17 May 2010 by Digital download and by CD on 24 May 2010.

Music video
The music video was directed by Kevin Godley, who has also directed videos for Eric Clapton and U2, as well as having directed the video for Melua's "Nine Million Bicycles". It features Melua performing the song playing the piano on a spinning platform surrounded by male dancers.

Critical reception
Nick Levine of Digital Spy gave the song a favorable review, stating, "there's no doubting her sincerity."  He felt the song was both positive and interesting, with a blend of styles and tempos that he described as "supremely elegant and subtly adventurous".

Track listing
Digital download

CD single

Chart performance
"The Flood" debuted on the UK Singles Chart on 23 May 2010 at a current peak of #35.

Weekly charts

Year-end charts

Release history

References

2010 singles
Katie Melua songs
Songs written by Guy Chambers
Songs written by Katie Melua
Dramatico singles
2010 songs
Music videos directed by Kevin Godley
Songs written by Lauren Christy
Song recordings produced by William Orbit